Molinaea is a genus of flowering plants belonging to the family Sapindaceae.

Its native range is the Western Indian Ocean. It is found in Madagascar, Mauritius and Réunion.

The genus name of Molinaea is in honour of Jean Desmoulins, also called Johannes Molinaeus (1530–1622), French doctor and botanist, student of Jacques Daléchamps and Guillaume Rondelet. It was first described and published in Gen. Pl. on page 248 in 1789.

Known species
According to Kew:
Molinaea alternifolia 
Molinaea andronensis 
Molinaea brevipes 
Molinaea laevis 
Molinaea macrantha 
Molinaea retusa 
Molinaea sessilifolia 
Molinaea tolambitou

References

Sapindaceae
Sapindaceae genera
Plants described in 1789
Flora of the Western Indian Ocean